Kathrine Møller Kühl (born 5 July 2003) is a Danish football midfielder who plays for Women's Super League club Arsenal. In 2021 she won her first cap for the Denmark national team.

Club career
Møller Kühl joined Hillerød Fodbold at five years old, and remained with the club for nine years. She joined FC Nordsjælland in 2018. She made her debut against FC Thy-Thisted Q, and she has since been a regular part of the team's starting line-up.  In July 2020, she was named Cup Fighter of the Year when FC Nordsjælland won the 2019–20 Danish Cup. After the match, she was highly praised by several media outlets for her good performance and was also compared to the Danish national team star Pernille Harder.  The same season she also helped win bronze for the team, in the club's first season in the league. 

Arsenal announced the signing of Møller Kühl on 7 January 2023. On 26 January, she made her Arsenal debut, coming off the bench in the 67th minute in the FA Women's League Cup quarterfinal game against Aston Villa.

International career
Her first call-up to the U/17 national team was on 28 February 2019, against Norway in Silkeborg. Her team won 5-2. She substituted in the 46th minute as a replacement for Sofie Bredgaard. She took part in the 2019 U/17 European Championship in Bulgaria, where the team did not progress from the group stage. Kühl officially played two games at the tournament. She has officially played 19 U-national matches, most recently in March 2020.

In March 2021, she was selected by national coach Lars Søndergaard for the senior national team for a friendly match against Wales, in a 1–1 friendly draw at Cardiff City Stadium. She was an 81st-minute substitute for Emma Snerle. She was in the squad for the subsequent friendlies, where she also started in the starting line-up, in Denmark's 3-2 win over Australia.

International goals

Honours 
Nordsjælland

 Danish Women's Cup: 2019–20

Arsenal

 FA Women's League Cup: 2022–23

References

External links

Profile at Danish Football Association 

2003 births
Living people
Danish women's footballers
Denmark women's international footballers
FC Nordsjælland (women) players
Arsenal W.F.C. players
Women's association football forwards
Sportspeople from the Capital Region of Denmark
UEFA Women's Euro 2022 players
Expatriate sportspeople in England

Denmark international footballers
Association football forwards